Zacharia Pothen Jeevichirippundu is a 2017 Malayalam language crime thriller film produced by Rajesh Perumbalam. The film stars Manoj K Jayan and Poonam Bajwa in the lead roles along with Babu Antony and Lal. The films is directed by Ullas Unnikrishnan. The music is composed by Dhibu Ninan Thomas. The screenplay is based on a story written by Manoj Nair.

Plot 
Manoj K Jayan is the protagonist of this film. The story starts in Zacharia Pothen's guest house in a hill station where he and his wife Maria along with their servant Chami live happily. The guest house is very special for both of them as it is their favourite place to spend their time. Zacharia is a retired army man. After many years, his army friend comes to enquire about Zacharia's death. At this time the only person inhabiting the guest house is Chami and it is revealed that both Zacharia, his wife and a stranger were found murdered one night in the house.

Later, Zacharia's friend finds out with the help of a video tape that Maria was cheating on Zacharia and the stranger found dead was her boyfriend. Zacharia had died by drinking the poison Maria gave him and both Maria and her boyfriend had died by drinking the poison Zacharia had given them.

Cast 
Manoj K. Jayan as Zacharia Pothen
Poonam Bajwa as Maria
Babu Antony as Chami
Lal as Sachi
Rahul Madhav as S.I Unnikrishnan
 Anjana Menon as Dr. Shabnam
Jayan Cherthala as Fr. Louis

Soundtrack 
The music is composed by Dhibu Ninan Thomas and sung by Shreya Ghoshal, K.S.Chithra and Vijay Yesudas.

 "Vadathikkatte"- Shreya Ghoshal 
 "Ee Neram"- Harichandran 
 "Mele Nilavinte"- K.S.Chithra, Vijay Yesudas 
 "Athirae"- Sharath Sasank

References

External links
 

2017 films
2010s Malayalam-language films
Indian crime thriller films
Indian thriller drama films
Indian crime drama films
2017 thriller drama films
2017 crime thriller films
2017 crime drama films